Tourism in Zanzibar includes the tourism industry and its effects on the islands of Unguja (known internationally as Zanzibar) and Pemba in Zanzibar a semi-autonomous region in the United Republic of Tanzania. Tourism is the top income generator for the islands, outpacing even the lucrative agricultural export industry and providing roughly 25% of income. The main airport on the island is Zanzibar International Airport, though many tourists fly into Dar es Salaam and take a ferry to the island.

The Government of Zanzibar plays a major role in promoting the industry, with the official government tourist page stating that its goal regarding tourism is to "become one of the top tourism destinations of the Indian Ocean, offering an up market, high quality product across the board within the coming 17 years." Zanzibar Commission for Tourism recorded more than doubling the number of tourists from the 2015/2016 fiscal year and the following year, from 162,242 to 376,000.

The increase in tourism has led to significant environmental impacts and mixed impacts on local communities, which were expected to benefit from economic development but in large part have not. Communities have witnessed increasing environmental degradation, and that flow of tourists has reduced the access of local communities to the marine and coastal resources that are the center of tourist activity.

History 
The opportunity for growing tourism in Zanzibar started in the 1980s, before which tourism largely did not exist. As of 1985 there were only 19,000 annual tourists. Restructuring of the economy in the 1980s due to the IMF instigated Investment Protection Act allowed for an increase in local businesses working in the industry. Increased growth of foreign-invested accommodations and hotels on the islands has allowed for growth in tourism from Italy, the UK, other parts of Europe and Africa.

In 2011 and 2012, two tourist ferries sank in the islands.

Following shutdowns due to the COVID 19 pandemic, Zanzibar reopened the islands in June 2020 without quarantine measures. In late 2020, the government promoted confidence in the tourism industry in Zanzibar and saw a partial recovery of 60% of the number of inbound tourists that it had seen in previous years by November.

Government activity 
The tourism in the region is promoted both by the Zanzibar Commission for Tourism Authority and Tanzania Tourist Board. The semi-autonomous nature of Zanzibar makes analysis of the situation more similar to Small Island Developing States. A 2014 study found that the planning, policy and governance practices for the local tourism industry were poor. Moreover, widespread corruption has led to government officials protecting investors and hotel owners, many of whom are not local parts of the economy.

Attractions

The principal grouping of attractions on Zanzibar are coastal tourism, terrestrial wildlife, dhow cruising and spice tours.

Stone Town

 

Zanzibar's capital is the historical Stone Town, home to much of Zanzibar's tourism industry. It is also a World Heritage Site. The town contains numerous historical and cultural sites, including Makusurani graveyard (where many of the islands' previous Arab rulers are buried), House of Wonders (a four story building which was the first place on the islands with electrical lights), Hamamni and Kidichi Persian Baths (the first public baths on the island), Dunga Ruins (ruins of a palace built in the 15th century by the rulers of the time), and the Peace Memorial Museum, a national historical museum detailing the island's long history.

Coastal tourism

Zanzibar is home to large amounts of beaches and clear Indian Ocean water, as well as coral and limestone scarps which allow for significant amounts of diving and snorkeling. The diving and snorkeling are done in marine parks. The aquatic life seen includes dolphins, moray eels, lion fish, octopus and lobster. Tourists may also go dhow cruising around the small islands. They can view the sunset and have refreshments on board. Some of these marine spaces are providing important ecosystem preservation, such as Chumbe Marine Park.

Spice tour
The town is famous for its spice tours. Tourists visit the various coconut and spice plantations in the island. Zanzibar is known for its variety of spices that are used to prepare food, cosmetics and medicines. Some of the fruits available include banana, coconut, lime, jackfruit and breadfruit. Spices include clove, nutmeg, black pepper, vanilla and coriander. Zanzibar is also known for its salt and seaweed farms that may be visited by tourists on request.

Jozani forest and Kidike root site
The Jozani forest is located in the central east region of Zanzibar consisting of a large mangrove swamp. The forest is home to the rare red colobus monkey. The forest is also home to 40 species of bird and 50 species of butterfly. The Kidike root site is a great place to view the endangered Pemba flying fox.

Challenges

Quality of infrastructure 
As of 2014, one third of housing did not meet international tourist standards. Accommodations that do meet that standard are expensive to operate, often having to generate their own electricity because of poor reliability of the local grid.

Local economy 
A 2015 study concluded that the tourist economy did not contribute to pro-poor growth. There is limited evidence that tourism has helped with poverty alleviation.

Though there is a lot of work in the face of the tourism industry, it does not all benefit local labor. 2009 estimates of workers in the tourism industry suggested that 83% of unskilled jobs in hotels and 70% in restaurants, but only 46% of managerial positions in hotels, and just 11% in restaurants, were held by local Zanzibari staff. Professional development opportunities on the island, for example the Zanzibar Hotel and Tourism Institute, are too expensive for locals. A 2020 article highlighted thousands of Maasai men migrating to join the tourism industry on the island and using their ethnic dress to sell goods and services, including sex work.

Most of the food goods eaten in the tourism sector cannot be produced locally, which increases prices for the local community.

Water resources 

Tourists use as much as 15 times as much water as locals, which combined with saltwater intrusion and general water scarcity raises serious water equity issues.

Marine environment 
The growing tourist industry is leading to a significant amount of plastic marine debris and human waste from untreated wastewater discharge.

Climate change 

45% of the local economy is dependent on the marine ecosystem, including much of the tourism. However, because much of the infrastructure and tourism is on the coast, many of the tourist destinations already are experiencing salt-water intrusion, sea level rise and coastal erosion—and much of this is expected to get worse as sea level rise continues. Other factors and risks include rising temperatures and uncertainty about freshwater supply.

Government actors coordinated by the First Vice President Office are working to build a National Framework for Climate Change Response which includes new rules and mechanisms for addressing threats to the tourism sector. Actors feel like the effectiveness of climate change adaptation have been hampered by resourcing and expertise needed to implement the programs.

Picture gallery

References

 
Zanzibar